The Roanoke, also spelled Roanoac, were a Carolina Algonquian-speaking people whose territory comprised present-day Dare County, Roanoke Island and part of the mainland at the time of English exploration and colonization. They were one of the numerous Carolina Algonquian tribes, which may have numbered 5,000–10,000 people in total in eastern North Carolina at the time of English encounter.

The last known chief of the Roanoke was believed to be Wanchese, who traveled to England with colonists in 1584. However there is no evidence that Wanchese was ever the chief of the Roanoke People, just that he was influential within his tribe. The smaller Croatan people may have been a branch of the Roanoke or a separate tribe allied with them.

History
The Roanoke may have had their capital on the western shore of Croatan Sound, at Dasamonguepeuk.  This was one of the significant towns noted by the English colonists in the sixteenth century.

Numerous place names were derived from the Roanoke.

See also
Algonquian languages
Algonquian peoples
Croatan
European Colonization of the Americas
Colonial history of the United States
English colonial empire
History of North Carolina
History of the United States
Pre-Columbian Era
Genocide of indigenous peoples

References

Indigenous peoples of the Southeastern Woodlands
Algonquian peoples
Native American history of North Carolina
Native American tribes in North Carolina
Algonquian ethnonyms
Outer Banks
Roanoke Island
Extinct ethnic groups